Derek Phillips (born April 18, 1976) is an American actor. He is best known for his role as Billy Riggins in the NBC sports drama series Friday Night Lights, as well as providing the voice and motion capture of Jerry Anderson in the action-adventure survival horror video game The Last of Us Part II. He has also voiced characters in video games such as Dishonored, The Last of Us, Life Is Strange, Battlefield Hardline, Fallout 4, and Rise of the Tomb Raider. He currently voices Heron on the Netflix animated series Blood of Zeus.

Early life 
Phillips was born in Miami, Florida, on April 18, 1976. He attended Westminster Christian School in Palmetto Bay, Florida, where he played football alongside future MLB baseball players Alex Rodriguez and Doug Mientkiewicz. He later attended Baylor University in Waco, Texas, where he received a BFA in acting.

Career 
Upon graduating, Phillips moved to New York City to look for acting roles. He performed throughout the country in numerous plays, including The Winter's Tale at the Baltimore Center Stage, Of Mice and Men at the Dallas Theater Center, The Glass Menagerie at the Virginia Stage Company, and King o' the Moon at the Capital Repertory Theatre. He is also an actor, associate producer, and assistant director at the award-winning ensemble theater company Second Thought, with whom he has performed in Douglas Post's Earth and Sky, the regional premiere of Eric Bogosian's Humpty Dumpty, and the world premiere of Steven Walters' Pluck the Day.

After years of regional theater and recurring roles on the television series Guiding Light, As the World Turns, and All My Children, Phillips had his breakout role as Billy Riggins on the NBC sports drama series Friday Night Lights. When the series ended, he went on to voice characters in video games such as Dishonored, Aliens: Colonial Marines, The Last of Us, Life Is Strange, Battlefield Hardline, Fallout 4, Rise of the Tomb Raider, and The Walking Dead: Michonne. He received more attention for providing the voice and motion capture of Jerry Anderson in the action-adventure survival horror video game The Last of Us Part II, and currently voices Heron on the Netflix animated series Blood of Zeus. He currently hosts the Friday Night Lights rewatch podcast "Clear Eyes, Full Hearts" with Stacey Oristano, who played Mindy Collette-Riggins (Tyra Collette's older sister, whom Billy eventually married).

Filmography

Film

Television

Video games

References

External links

1976 births
Living people
American male film actors
American male television actors
American male video game actors
American male voice actors
Baylor University alumni
Male actors from Miami
21st-century American male actors